A ticker-tape parade is a parade event held in an urban setting, characterized by large amounts of shredded paper thrown onto the parade route from the surrounding buildings, creating a celebratory flurry of paper. Originally, actual ticker tape was used, but now mostly confetti is substituted. 

The concept originates in and is most usually associated with the United States, especially New York City. Outside the United States, ticker-tape parades are often associated with the 1978 FIFA World Cup held in Argentina.

History

The term originated in New York City after a spontaneous celebration held on October 28, 1886, during the dedication of the Statue of Liberty and is still most closely associated with New York City. The term ticker tape originally referred to the use of the paper output of ticker-tape machines, which were remotely driven devices used in brokerages to provide updated stock market quotes. The term ticker came from the sound made by the machine as it printed.

In New York City, ticker-tape parades are reserved for special occasions. Soon after the first such parade in 1886, city officials realized the utility of such events and began to hold them on triumphal occasions, such as the return of Theodore Roosevelt from his African safari, Gertrude Ederle swimming the English Channel, and Charles Lindbergh's trans-Atlantic flight. The first individual to be honored with a ticker-tape parade was Admiral George Dewey, hero of the battle of Manila Bay, in 1899, when two million people came out to New York City. Following World War II, several ticker-tape parades were given in honor of victorious generals and admirals, including General Dwight D. Eisenhower and Admiral Chester Nimitz. Two of the longest and largest ticker-tape parades were given for World War II and Korean War General Douglas MacArthur in 1951, after he was relieved of duty by President Harry S. Truman, and for astronaut John Glenn in 1962.  Golfing greats Bobby Jones (1921 and 1930) and Ben Hogan (1953) were honored with ticker-tape parades after their British Open triumphs.

The section of lower Broadway through the Financial District that serves as the parade route for these events is colloquially called the "Canyon of Heroes". More than 200 black granite strips embedded in the sidewalks along the Canyon of Heroes list honorees of past ticker-tape parades. By the early 21st century, such parades became far more infrequent, largely limited to championship sports teams, and celebrations of the return of astronauts and military troops.

Ticker tape technology became obsolete in the 1960s, as television and computers came into use for transmitting financial information. Modern parades utilize waste office paper and toilet paper that have been cut using conventional paper shredders. The city also distributes paper confetti.

See also

Lafayette Welcoming Parade of 1824 (New York)
List of ticker-tape parades in New York City

References

Parades